Michael Scanlan (born 1961) is a United States diplomat.

Scanlan made a career in the U.S. Department of State, also serving as director of the office of eastern European affairs, and as chargé d'affaires to the U.S. Embassy in Minsk, Belarus from July 2009 to June 2013.

From July 2014 till 2019, Scanlan headed the Organization for Security and Co-operation in Europe (OSCE) Mission to Moldova in Chisinau, also serving as OSCE mediator to the Transdniestrian settlement process.

In 2019 Scanlan moved to Sarajevo, Bosnia and Herzegovina, succeeding to US diplomat Dennis Walter Hearne as Principal Deputy High Representative under High Representatives Valentin Inzko (until 2021) and Christian Schmidt. As PDHR, Scanlan is also Brčko District Supervisor, although supervision was formally suspended in 2012.

References

21st-century American diplomats
Ambassadors of the United States to Belarus
Organization for Security and Co-operation in Europe
Living people
1961 births